OL may refer to:

Arts and entertainment
 Orphaned Land, an Israeli progressive metal band
 Old Lace (comics) a telepathically linked dinosaur hero

Businesses and organizations
 OLT Express Germany (IATA code: OL), a scheduled and charter airline based in Emden in Germany
 Open Library, an online project intended to create "one web page for every book ever published"

Places
 OL postcode area, for parts of Greater Manchester and Lancashire, surrounding Oldham, England
 Oulu railway station, Finland (abbreviated OL)

Science and technology
 -ol, a suffix for chemical compounds that are alcohols
 Guillaume-Antoine Olivier, in botanist or zoologist author citations (Ol.)
 , an HTML tag for creating ordered list elements
 Optics Letters, a journal published by the Optical Society of America
 A Unified Soil Classification System symbol for organic silt and/or clay

Sport
 Olympic Games, an international sport event
 Olympique Lyonnais, a prominent French association football club based in Lyon
 Olympique Lyonnais Féminin, the women's football section of the above club
 OL Reign, an American women's soccer team primarily owned by the parent company of Olympique Lyonnais   
 Offensive lineman, a player who plays on the offensive line of scrimmage in American football

Other
 Office lady, a low-tier female office worker in Japan
 Old Lancastrians, alumni of Lancaster Royal Grammar School, England
 Old Lawrentians, alumni of St Lawrence College, Ramsgate, England
 Ol Chiki script, writing script for Santali language
 Ol Onal script, writing script for Bhumij language